The Volvo B12B was a rear-engined coach and intercity bus chassis built by Volvo. It is built as a direct replacement of Volvo B12 in the European market and the Volvo B10B.

The B12B could be fitted with Volvo DH12C (later DH12D and DH12E) 6-cylinder 12-litre engine, coupled to a Volvo-automated, ZF automatic, or later, Volvo I-Shift transmission.

Volvo also developed a low-entry variant of B12B, known as the Volvo B12BLE, for intercity and city operations.

The Volvo B12B has been superseded by the Volvo B13R with a 13-litre engine.

See also 

 List of buses

External links

Product description in Volvo website

References

B12B
Bus chassis
Coaches (bus)
Double-decker buses